Ankola was a constituency of the Karnataka Legislative Assembly, which ceased to exist after 2008. It came under Uttara Kannada Lok Sabha constituency, Karnataka state, India.

Members of Legislative Assembly

References 

Former assembly constituencies of Karnataka
Uttara Kannada district